Hafiz Saeed (born 1950) is Pakistani Islamist militant, the co-founder of Lashkar-e-Taiba and the chief of Jama'at-ud-Da'wah

Hafiz Saeed may also refer to:

Hafiz Ihsan Saeed, inmate at Guantanamo Bay detention camp until 2005
Hafiz Saeed Khan (1972–2016), an Islamic militant who served as the Islamic State emir for its Khorasan province, which is active in Afghanistan and Pakistan